Eugnosta misella is a species of moth of the family Tortricidae. It is found in Kenya, Tanzania and South Africa.

The wingspan is 9–11 mm. The forewings are ochreous brown with a faint pattern. The hindwings are dark fuscous.

References

Moths described in 1993
Eugnosta